The Seedwings Europe Merlin is an Austrian high-wing, single-place, hang glider that was designed and produced by Seedwings Europe of Schlitters. Now out of production, when it was available the aircraft was supplied complete and ready-to-fly.

Design and development
The Merlin was designed as an intermediate-level hang glider with an emphasis on optimized sail design to eliminate twist at all speeds. It is made from aluminum tubing, with the double-surface wing covered in Dacron sailcloth.

The models are each named for their rough wing area in square feet.

Variants
Merlin 133
Small-sized model for lighter pilots. Its  span wing is cable braced from a single kingpost. The nose angle is 132°, the wing area is and the aspect ratio is 8:1. The glider is DHV 3 certified.
Merlin 148
Mid-sized model for medium-weight pilots. Its  span wing is cable braced from a single kingpost. The glider is DHV 2-3 certified.
Merlin 158
Large-sized model for heavier pilots. Its  span wing is cable braced from a single kingpost. The glider is DHV 2-3 certified.

Specifications (Merlin 133)

References

Merlin
Hang gliders